Marcin Lubiejewski (born October 10, 1981) is a Polish volleyball player.

References

1981 births
Living people
Polish men's volleyball players
AZS Olsztyn players
Volleyball players from Warsaw